Organized crime in Minneapolis refers to the illegal activity of the early 20th century in Minneapolis. This issue was first brought to public attention by Lincoln Steffens in the book The Shame of the Cities which chronicles the widespread corruption in major political parties in the 19th century and the continued efforts to fix this ongoing issue. A. A. Ames was a notable figure who was exposed due to this book, as he and the Minneapolis police force were caught dealing with illegal businesses syndicates. In 1902, Ames fled to Indiana and resigned as mayor on the 6th September.

See also
 Crime in Minnesota
Crime in the United States
A. A. Ames

References

Steffens, Lincoln. The shame of the cities. New York: McClure, Phillips, 1904.

Further reading 
Minneapolis Organized Crime (1900-2000)
History of the Fire and Police Departments of Minneapolis, 1890

History of Minneapolis
Organized crime in Minnesota
Minnesota